Bryan Shepherd (born March 2, 1991) is a former American football cornerback who is currently the quality control coach for Syracuse Orange. He played college football at North Dakota State University. Originally, he collegiately played for the University of Nebraska Omaha before transferring. The Washington Redskins signed him in 2014 after going unselected in the 2014 NFL Draft.

College career
Shepherd attended North Dakota State University from 2011 to 2013.

Professional Playing career

Washington Redskins
The Washington Redskins signed Shepherd as an undrafted free agent on May 14, 2014. The Redskins released Shepherd on August 25, 2014.

Montreal Alouettes
Shepherd was signed to the Montreal Alouettes' practice roster on October 4, 2014.

References

External links

Nebraska–Omaha Mavericks football bio
Montreal Alouettes bio

1991 births
Living people
American football cornerbacks
Nebraska–Omaha Mavericks football players
North Dakota State Bison football coaches
North Dakota State Bison football players
Sportspeople from Olathe, Kansas
Players of American football from Kansas
Washington Redskins players